The Suspicious Housekeeper is a 2013 South Korean television series starring Choi Ji-woo, Lee Sung-jae, Wang Ji-hye and Kim So-hyun. It aired on SBS TV from 23 September to 26 November 2013 on Mondays and Tuesdays at 21:55 for 20 episodes.

Cast
Choi Ji-woo as Park Bok-nyeo 
Lee Sung-jae as Eun Sang-chul 
Kim So-hyun as Eun Han-kyul, the eldest daughter
Chae Sang-woo as Eun Doo-kyul, the second son
Nam Da-reum as Eun Se-kyul, the third eldest son
Kang Ji-woo as Eun Hye-kyul, the youngest daughter
Wang Ji-hye as Yoon Song-hwa
Park Geun-hyung as Woo Geum-chi, Sang-chul's father-in-law
Shim Yi-young as Woo Na-young, Sang-chul's sister-in-law
Cho Yeon-woo as Manager Choi
Jang Seo-won as Lee Dong-shik
Baek Seung-hyeon as Manager Kim
Kim Hae-sook as Housekeeping Agency director Hong
Jung Suk-yong as Shin Jung-man
Ra Mi-ran as Yang Mi-ja 
Jung Moon-sung as Lee Tae-shik
Hwang Jae-won as Oh Eo-jin, Hye-kyul's friend in kindergarten
Bang Eun-hee as Eo-jin's mother
Lee Seung-hyung as Oh Nam-jae, Eo-jin's father
Seo Kang-joon as Choi Soo-hyuk 
Park Ji-bin as Shin Woo-jae
Song Jong-ho as Jang Do-hyung/Seo Ji-hoon (cameo)
Lee Yang-hee as Soo-hyuk's father (cameo)
Kim Kwang-kyu as Han-kyul's homeroom teacher
Im Ji-kyu as Se-kyul's homeroom teacher
Son Sung-joon as perpetrator of bullying
Kang Yi-seok as Jang-tae, The Boy who attacks Eun Se-kyul
Jeon Ye-seo as Writer Kwon (cameo)
Kim Ji-sook as Bo-nyeo's mother-in-law, Go Min-gook's mother (cameo)
Kwak Do-won as Go Min-gook, Bok-nyeo's late husband (cameo)
Kim Hee-jung as Woo Sun-young, Eun Sang-chul's late wife (cameo)

Plot
Park Bok-nyeo is a mysterious housekeeper who will do whatever is asked of her, even, so the rumor goes, if that means murder. Her latest stint involves caring for a recently widowed father, and his four troubled children, all of whom are grappling with the aftermath of their mother's sudden death. The stoic new arrival, who shows barely any trace of emotion, acts as a catalyst for the family members to understand each other better and reconcile their relationships.

Ratings

Awards and nominations

Title controversy
On 6 September 2013, the Korean Women Workers Association and the National House Management Cooperative held a press conference in front of SBS and denounced the use of the word gajeongbu (which literally translates to "a house woman") in the title, saying it belittles housekeepers. They asked that the production change the title to gajeong-gwanlisa ("house manager"), while the National Institute of the Korean Language recommended using gasa-doumi ("housework helper"). An official from the network said that they are retaining the word gajeongbu because it is the Korean word equivalent for the Japanese source material's kaseifu. Instead, they compromised by refraining from using the controversial word in the script, and added a scene that explains what to call people who clean and cook at the homes of others, and what the appropriate title is for them.

International broadcast
 It aired in Japan on cable channel KNTV from 23 September to 1 October 2014.
 It aired in Vietnam on VTC9 - Let's Viet from 13 February 2015, under the title Quản gia bí ẩn.
 It aired in Thailand on PPTV from 9 February to 14 April 2015.

References

External links
 The Suspicious Housekeeper official SBS website 
 
 

2013 South Korean television series debuts
2013 South Korean television series endings
Seoul Broadcasting System television dramas
South Korean television series based on Japanese television series
South Korean comedy-drama television series